Richard Sloan (1935–2007) was an American artist.  He painted wildlife in Arizona and in rainforests.

Considered to be North America's "Dean Of Rainforest Painters", Sloan was born in Chicago, Illinois, where he attended the America Academy Of Art. He then worked as an advertising illustrator before joining Chicago's Lincoln Park Zoo as staff artist.  After a 1966 sellout solo exhibition at the Abercrombie & Fitch Gallery in Chicago, Sloan left Lincoln Park to embark upon a lifetime of capturing the world's rainforests in paint. He was the first wildlife artist in North America to turn all his efforts as a painter to documenting exotic animals of the world's tropics.

He first traveled to British Guiana (Guyana) in 1969 and made seventeen expeditions to the Amazon Basin, the Peruvian Andes, Guatemala, Trinidad and Tobago, Belize, Mexico's Yucatán Peninsula and Thailand.

His paintings have been exhibited at the National Geographic Society's Explorers Hall, the American Museum of Natural History, the Carnegie Museum of Art, the Gilcrease Museum, the Royal Scottish Academy and numerous other museums and galleries.

Since 1979 his work has been included in twenty-five Leigh Yawkey Woodson Art Museum Birds In Art exhibitions, and in 1994 the Museum conferred upon Sloan the honor of Master Wildlife Artist. In March 2002 at the invitational, juried exhibition Impressions Of Bonnet House in Ft. Lauderdale, Florida, he was given the Peoples Choice Award.

His works are included in the permanent collections of the Smithsonian Institution, Leigh Yawkey Woodson Art Museum, the Illinois State Museum, the Denver Museum of Natural History, the North Carolina Museum Of Natural Sciences and private collections throughout the world.

He has been commissioned by the World Wildlife Fund to design postage stamps and first day covers for Trinidad, Tobago, Guatemala, the Philippines and the Falkland Islands. In the spring of 1998, the University Of Arizona Press published The Raptors Of Arizona, a 220-page volume on the birds of prey of the American Southwest, featuring 42 Sloan paintings. In recognition of this work, in August, 2003, he was inducted into the Arizona Outdoor Hall of Fame.

Special achievements

2003 - Arizona Outdoor Hall Of Fame
For "The Raptors Of Arizona"
 
1998 - Award Of Excellence / Society Of Animal Artists
For "The Wild Bunch"

1994 - Master Wildlife Artist / The Leigh Yawkey Woodson Art Museum

1990 - Award Of Excellence / Society Of Animal Artists
For "Amazon Backwater"

Collections
2005 - Art Institute of the Arizona-Sonora Desert Museum - Burrowing Owls at sunrise
 
1993 - Arizona Wildlife Foundation - 42 Original Paintings for "The Raptors Of Arizona"
 
1992 - Leigh Yawkey Woodson Art Museum - Original Painting "Triple Threat"
 
1968 - Smithsonian Institution - "Eastern Bluebirds"

Publications

The Best Of Wildlife Art 2 (1999)
3 Illustrations - 
Author: Rachel Rubin Wolf
Published by: North Light Books
 
Wildlife Art (1999)
1 Illustration - 
Author: Alan Singer
Published by: Rockport Publishers, Inc.
 
The Raptors Of Arizona (1998)
42 Habitat Paintings - A 220-page hard cover volume containing the latest scientific information on all Birds Of Prey occurring in Arizona.
Author: Richard Glinski
Published by: University Of Arizona Press
 
Modern Wildlife Painting (1998)
1 Illustration - 
Author: Nicholis Hammond
Published by: Yale University Press
 
The Best of Wildlife Art (1997)
1 Illustration - 
Author: Rachel Rubin Wolf
Published by: North Light Books
 
More Wildlife Painting - Techniques Of The Modern Masters (1996)
7 Illustrations - 
Author: Susan Rayfield
Published by: Watson Guptill
 
Painting Birds Step by Step (1996)
4 Illustrations - 
Author: Bart Rulon
Published by: North Light Books
 
Raptors...Forests...Ruins / The World Of Richard Sloan (1993)
3 Illustrations - Magazine Article
Author: Tyler Granville
Published by: Informart
 
From Hawks To Hornbills & Back Again / The Art Of Richard Sloan (1991)
8 Illustrations - Magazine Article
Author: Judy Hughes
Published by: Wildlife Art News
 
The Art Of Richard Sloan (1989)
Cover Art / Frigate Birds In Flight - Magazine
Published by: U.S.Art
 
Artist Of The Ancient Forest (1986)
5 Illustrations - 
Author: Jay Heinrichs
Published by: International Wildlife / The National Wildlife Federation

References

External links
Richard Sloan Raptors of Arizona Art Prints

1935 births
2007 deaths
American artists